Laura Laur is a Canadian drama film, directed by Brigitte Sauriol and released in 1989. Adapted from the novel by Suzanne Jacob, the film stars Paula de Vasconcelos as the titular Laura Laur, an independent and sexually liberated woman who happily juggles relationships with two lovers, Gilles (Dominique Briand) and Pascal (Éric Cabana).

The film was produced in the summer and fall of 1988, Its cast also includes Andrée Lachapelle, Claude Préfontaine and Jean-Pierre Ronfard.

References

External links
 

1989 films
1989 drama films
Canadian drama films
Films directed by Brigitte Sauriol
Films based on Canadian novels
French-language Canadian films
1980s Canadian films